Kunchadka is a small village in the southern state of Karnataka, India. It is located in the Aletty Village, Sullia taluk of Dakshina Kannada district in Karnataka.

Dialect
The Arebhashe dialect of Kannada is spoken mainly by the Gowda community. The official language is Kannada.

Freedom movement
 Amara Sullia Freedom Movement of 1837 Kunchadka Rama Gowda team  captured the government treasury in Kasaragod

Crops
 Areca nut
 Banana
 Black pepper
 Hevea brasiliensis

See also
 Aletty
 Sullia
 Mangalore
 Dakshina Kannada

References

External links
 http://dk.nic.in/

Villages in Dakshina Kannada district